Aku Aku may refer to:
 Akuaku, a former settlement in New Zealand
 Aku-Aku (mythology), beings in Easter Island mythology
 Aku Aku (character), in the Crash Bandicoot series
 Aku-Aku, a book by Thor Heyerdahl
 , a Norwegian documentary film about Thor Heyerdahl
 "Aku-Aku", a song by Styx from the album Pieces of Eight (1978)